John Mitchell Robinson (December 6, 1827 – January 14, 1896) was an American jurist who served as chief judge of the supreme court of the U.S. state of Maryland, the Court of Appeals.

Early life
John Mitchell Robinson was born on December 6, 1827, in Tuckahoe Neck, Caroline County, Maryland to Peter Robinson and Sarah Mitchell Robinson.  He attended public schools in Denton, Maryland, and graduated from Dickinson College in 1847. He went on to study law under the tutelage of William M. Meredith, Richard B. Carmichael, and Madison Brown, and was admitted to the bar in 1849.

Career
After admission to the bar, Robinson began to practice law in Centreville, Maryland.  In 1850, he served as Deputy Attorney General for Queen Anne's and Kent Counties. He also served as State's Attorney for Queen Anne's County from 1851 to 1855, and later as judge of the Queen Anne's and Kent Counties Circuit Court, Third Judicial District, from 1864 to 1867.

In 1867, Robinson was appointed to the newly reconfigured Maryland Court of Appeals as an associate judge.  He served in that position until 1884, when he resigned to bid for the Democratic nomination to the United States Senate.  In 1893, he returned to the court as Chief Judge, and served in that position until his death.

Personal life
Robinson married Marianna Stoughton Emory, with whom he had five daughters and one son.

Robinson died on January 14, 1896, in Annapolis. He was buried at "Waverly" in Queen Anne's County.

References

Chief Judges of the Maryland Court of Appeals
Dickinson College alumni
Maryland lawyers
1827 births
1896 deaths
People from Caroline County, Maryland
People from Denton, Maryland
People from Centreville, Maryland
19th-century American judges
19th-century American lawyers